The Judo competition at the 2001 East Asian Games was contested in eight weight classes, eight each for men and women. 

This competition was held at Osaka Prefectural Gymnasium, from 24 to 27 May 2001.

Medal overview

Men's events

Women's events

Medals table 

2001
2001 East Asian Games
2001
Asian Games, East
Asian Games, East 2001